Stuart Mossman (May 13, 1942 – March 2, 1999) was an American guitar maker, entertainer and entrepreneur who built 6,000 guitars from 1968 to 1984 that were played by several professional guitarists, including John Denver, Eric Clapton, Albert Lee, Doc Watson, Hank Snow, Cat Stevens and Merle Travis. Mossman's work is seen as the foundation for today's generations of Luthiers who build guitars from fine tone woods.

Background
Mossman was born in Hinsdale, Illinois, on May 13, 1942. He began making nylon-string guitars in 1961 and spent several years designing 40 to 50 prototypes in his garage in Winfield, Kansas. Mossman took his first steel-string flat top to legendary acoustic singer-songwriter Doc Watson and asked for his "brutal" opinion. Watson gave it to him, and Mossman took his advice and applied it to his next design. He took another guitar to Watson at the 1969 Philadelphia Folk Festival, where, this time, the guitarist used it on stage, and reportedly told Mossman it was the "second best guitar he'd ever played." In 1970 Mossman moved his operations to Strother Field just outside Winfield and it was there that he established S.L. Mossman Guitars. Using old-world building techniques, top-quality woods, and a proprietary bracing structure, Mossman guitars entered series production in the early 1970s.

S.L. Mossman Guitars
Mossman felt that the boom in folk music during the 1960s/70s pushed a popular demand for acoustic instruments. While Gibson, Martin and Guild were increasing production, imports from the Pacific rim countries were beginning to exploit the lower end of the market. He had a strong disdain towards the use of plywood and insisted on solid-wood construction for the production of his guitars. In an early catalog for Mossman guitars he stated: "The vile abomination is currently being perpetrated on the unsuspecting guitar-playing public on a grand scale. There are so many of these plywood things on the market at this writing that there is a possibility you may not have even heard a real guitar. We at Mossman considered plywood briefly one day, and unanimously decided that plywood makes the best cement forms available. We do not now, nor will we ever, stoop to the level of plywood construction and we apologize for our contemporaries who have lowered the station of our craft by using laminated backs and sides."

Since the Mossman shop was small enough for Mossman to oversee every model, he was able to offer a variety of custom options for his customers which included: an extra-wide neck, 12 strings and custom inlay and engravings. Also, customers were able to order a specific type of voicing for their guitars described in the catalog as "overbalanced bass, overbalanced treble, or balanced bass and treble." One of the unique features on the Mossman guitars are their thin neck arrangements, which were carved by a worker at the factory who played banjo and preferred the feel and playability of "lower-profile necks."

Despite the fact that he lost a lot of business in comparison to competing companies like Martin Guitars, who also used high-quality tone woods and manufactured over 20 times the number of guitars Mossman did daily, Mossman never wanted to produce guitars on a mass scale.

The company gained notable recognition by 1974 and was producing up to eight to ten guitars a day, each one personally inspected by Mossman himself.

"I Personally inspected each guitar we made before shipment. Eight to ten per day is as many as we would ever want to make because it would be difficult to personally inspect more than that amount.Guitar models

(From the catalog at mossman-guitars.com)
Tennessee Flat Top- constructed with mahogany back and sides, rosewood fingerboard and bride, dot inlay, and black plastic binding on top and back of body. Suggested retail $350 in 1972.

Flint Hills- East Indian Rosewood back and sides with white plastic binding and herringbone inlay around sound hole. $450 retail(1972).

Great Plains- Brazilian rosewood back and sides and herringbone inlay around the perimeter of the body. Suggested retail (1972) at $525.

Golden Era- This was Mossman's top line instrument and it featured select Brazilian rosewood back and sides, German spruce top, abalone inlay around the top, 3-piece back with abalone back strip inlay, bound neck and headstock, gold Grovers, and an intricate abalone vine inlay up the length of the fingerboard. Retailed at $875(1972).

Factory Fire
In 1975 a fire erupted in the finishing area, which contained a number of flammable chemicals, resulting in the loss of one of the company's buildings that was used for manufacturing and the assembly line. No injuries or deaths were sustained during the course of the fire, and only a few guitars were incinerated; however, the complete supply of rare Brazilian rosewood was destroyed. Fortunately, Mossman had secured a $400,000 loan from a government-backed Small Business Administration before the fire, so the money was used to rebuild and expand the production facilities.

C.G. Conn Company
The same year of the company fire Mossman initiated a deal with the C.G. Conn Company and produced 1,200 guitars for dealer set for distribution. The guitars were stored in a warehouse in Nevada, which had minimal controls for heat and humidity and the solid wood of the Mossman guitars were repeatedly 'heated during the day and frozen at night' causing the finish on the guitars to suffer cracks and breaks.

Responsibility and compensation for the loss of guitars was disputed between Mossman and Conn. Conn withheld payment for the instruments already purchased and this initiated a lawsuit between the two companies. Ultimately the lawsuit settled the dispute and the financial costs of the matter forced Mossman to fire most of his staff. By the late 70s Mossman guitars had but only a few employees producing a modest number of instruments a month. Subsequently, the model line was downsized as well and this resulted in heavy financial losses for the company.

The start of the new decade took a toll on Mossman and his company. As the popularization of synthesizers and electric guitars sales skyrocketed, acoustic guitar sales were dwindling. Mossman struggled to continue, his factory workers even offered to work for two months without pay to get the company back on its feet again.

Health concerns
In 1983 Mossman decided to sell the company after suffering from serious respiratory problems. Mossman began to feel that his breathing was being affected by years of inhaling 'sawdust, lacquer fumes and ablaone shell fragments'. In a press release issued by the guitar publication, Frets, Mossman stated:

It is with a great deal of sadness that I must write this letter, for it closes a chapter of nearly 20 years in my guitar making life. Unfortunately, due to carelessness in the early years regarding safety precautions in the finish room (for the first five years, I didn't even wear a mask), I have developed sensitivity to glues and lacquers, and my doctor has recommended that I pursue other interests. I would like to take this opportunity to thank you for your support-not only for my efforts, but on behalf of many other small companies-and to express my sincere appreciation to your readers for electing me 'Best Luthier' once and 'Runner Up' several times. Working for awards is not why one strives for higher achievement, but they are a delightful acknowledgment. I would also like to make special thanks to both Dan Crary and John Denver for their use of our instruments and the personal interest in us-a kindness that cannot be replaced. And last and most important, I would like to thank the owners of Mossman guitars everywhere. Without them, I could never have turned a dream into reality. It is my hope that the collectors' items they own give them years of joy.

One of Mossman's employees, Scott Baxendale, offered to buy the Mossman name, inventory and equipment to continue the production of Mossman guitars. Before turning over the company to Baxendale, however, Mossman designed 25 guitars using the finest wood that had been set aside for years. These "final 25" have become a tale of popular folklore as Mossman dedicated a lifetime of experience and the most selective woods to create the instruments.

After Mossman signed over the rights to his company, Baxendale owned and operated S.L. Mossman guitars until it was sold to John Kinsey and Bob Casey in 1989. The company relocated to Sulphur Springs, Texas, where it continues to manufacture top-of-the-line custom-made guitars today. 'We bought the company because of the history and reputation that Mossman had established and because we felt it was a real opportunity," stated Kinsey.

Death
Mossman spent the remaining years after his retirement at his home in Winfield, Kansas, with his wife and two daughters. Mossman frequently volunteered and performed at festivals and elementary schools, influencing younger audiences towards folk and bluegrass music.

Mossman died on March 2, 1999, from cardiac arrest. He was 56 years old.

His work and legacy continue to be recognized today through his guitars, musical contributions and appearances in films.

Walnut Valley Music Festival
Mossman is attributed as one of the founding members of the Walnut Valley Music Festival in Winfield, Kansas. The festival hosts a variety of contests, art and musical performances that celebrates the diversity and art of bluegrass and folk music. Some notable performers who have frequented the festival are Jimmy Driftwood, Art Eskeridge, Glenda Bickell, Mance Lipscomb, Johnny Vandiver & Jo Wright, Harry Weldon, Poor Bill Miller, Doc Watson, Merle Watson, Charles Cloud, Shannon Singers, Very & Ray, Pat and Victoria Garvey and the Revelators.

Filmography
The actors David, Keith and Robert Carradine all owned and adored Mossman guitars and even found Mossman cameo roles in their films such as Cloud Dancer, The Long Riders and the television movie Murder Ordained.

Keith Carradine's Oscar- and Golden Globe-winning song, "I'm Easy", which appeared in the 1975 Robert Altman film, Nashville was performed on his custom-made S.L. Mossman guitar. The same guitar was featured throughout the film as Carradine's character, who is a renowned folk singer, performs with it.

Stuart Mossman: A Modern StradivariStuart Mossman: A Modern Stradivari, directed by Barry Brown, premiered at the 25th Santa Barbara International Film Festival, in February 2010 to a sold out audience. In attendance at the screening were Mossman's wife, and his daughters who thanked the director and audience for the interests and support for their father.   The film also screened at the Tallgrass Film Festival in Wichita in October 2010.

The documentary chronicles Mossman's life through testimonials from Mossman's employees, fans, and friends who recount his work, influence and their time shared with the luthier. One scene in the film showcases the world's largest collective of Mossman guitar players gathered at the Smithsonian Memorial to Mossman, in Winfield, Kansas which commemorates his contribution to the guitar and music industries.

The film features the Carradine brothers, David, Keith and Bobby performing on their custom-built Mossman guitars, they all divulge stories of how they became supporters of Mossman and his art. "The story is spoken by those who lived it, directly to the audience with unfiltered emotion-told with purposeful simplicity." Mossman had appeared with David Carradine in Cloud Dancer (1980), which Brown also directed, and with all three of the Carradine brothers mentioned in The Long Riders'' (1980). The film is also noted as David Carradine's final onscreen performance and the end of the movie attributes to both him and Mossman as Carradine's brother Bobby and his son perform on their Mossman guitars at David Carradine's gravesite.

References

External links
 Mossman Guitars Official Website
 
 Scott Baxendale NAMM Oral History Interview (2003)
 Mossman Blogspot
 The Legend of Stuart Mossman
http://www.guitarbench.com/guitar-database/mossman-guitars-identification-registry/

Guitar makers
1942 births
1999 deaths